Peng Jiarui (born April 1961) is Chinese military officer and politician currently serving as vice chairman of Xinjiang Uygur Autonomous Region and vice chairman of the Xinjiang Regional Committee of the Chinese People's Political Consultative Conference. He previously served as commander of Xinjiang Production and Construction Corps. He joined the Chinese Communist Party (CCP) in December 1983. He was a representative of the 17th, 18th, and 19th National Congress of the Chinese Communist Party. He is a delegate to the 13th National People's Congress.

Biography
Peng was born in Wuwei County, Gansu, in April 1961. In 1979, he entered Xinjiang Political and Legal Cadre School, majoring in public security. He worked in Changji Hui Autonomous Prefecture after university in 1981, where he eventually became deputy party secretary and vice governor in 2001. In October 2004, he was promoted to become party secretary of Tacheng Prefecture, a position he held until July 2011, when he was appointed party secretary of Bayingolin Mongol Autonomous Prefecture. He was appointed secretary-general of CCP Xinjiang Uygur Autonomous Region Committee in December 2015 and in March 2016 was admitted to member of the standing committee of the CCP Xinjiang Uygur Autonomous Region Committee, the region's top authority. He was made vice chairman of Xinjiang Uygur Autonomous Region in March 2017, concurrently serving as commander of Xinjiang Production and Construction Corps and vice chairman of the Xinjiang Regional Committee of the Chinese People's Political Consultative Conference. On 31 July 2020, the United States government imposed Global Magnitsky Human Rights Accountability Act sanctions and visa restrictions against Peng, together with Sun Jinlong for their connection to similar human rights abuse against the ethnic minorities in Xinjiang.

References

1961 births
Living people
People from Wuwei
Central Party School of the Chinese Communist Party alumni
People's Republic of China politicians from Gansu
Chinese Communist Party politicians from Gansu
Delegates to the 13th National People's Congress